Decaprenyl-diphosphate synthase subunit 1 is an enzyme that in humans is encoded by the PDSS1 gene.

The protein encoded by this gene is an enzyme that elongates the prenyl side-chain of coenzyme Q, or ubiquinone, one of the key elements in the respiratory chain. The gene product catalyzes the formation of all trans-polyprenyl pyrophosphates from isopentyl diphosphate in the assembly of polyisoprenoid side chains, the first step in coenzyme Q biosynthesis. The protein may be peripherally associated with the inner mitochondrial membrane, though no transit peptide has been definitively identified to date.

References

Further reading